The Oldsmobile Bravada is a four-door mid-size SUV manufactured and marketed by the Oldsmobile division of General Motors. The Bravada was built across three generations as a rebadged variant of the Chevrolet Blazer and GMC Jimmy. It was the only SUV manufactured or marketed by Oldsmobile, and the first light truck offered in the United States by a GM brand other than Chevrolet or GMC since before World War II.

The first generation (1991–1994) and second-generation (1996–2001) used the GMT330 platform, and the third generation (2002-2004) used the GMT360 platform. The third generation was the only version offered in Canada.

First generation (1991–1994)

The 1991 Bravada was an upscale version of the then-new 4-door S-Blazer/Jimmy. It was the first truck-based vehicle offered by Oldsmobile since the 1920s, and the division's first-ever sport utility vehicle. At the time of its debut, the Bravada was sold only in the United States. Unlike the compact Blazer and Jimmy, there was no pickup truck equivalent.

In keeping with its upscale image, the Bravada standardized many features that the Blazer and Jimmy made optional, including SmartTrak all-wheel drive, Anti-lock brakes, remote keyless entry, body-colored bumpers and exterior trim (with lower body cladding which was body-colored, similar to the competitor Jeep Grand Cherokee Limited), and the 4.3 L W-code engine. At the heart of the SmartTrak system was the Borg Warner 4472 transfer case (also shared with the limited production GMC Typhoon and AWD Astro/Safari vans), offering 65% rear and 35% front torque with more to the front when the system detected slippage.

The design of the Bravada was almost identical to that of the Blazer and Jimmy. The main differences were a unique front clip featuring a continuation of the ribbed side cladding and the Oldsmobile emblem embossed on the tail lights. Unique wheel options and some small trim changes rounded out the visual differences between the Bravada and its stablemates.

The 4.3 L V6 engine got a horsepower boost to 200 for 1992. Also for '92, the Bravada's instrument panel was slightly modified to differ from its siblings. 1993 saw the addition of an overhead console with compass, temperature, and reading lights. An optional Gold package with gold exterior badging and special gold aluminum wheels was also new for '93. The first-generation Bravada was produced into the 1994 model year.

Engines
 1991 – 4.3 L LB4 V6, TBI, 160 hp (119 kW)/230 lb·ft (312 N·m) (VIN Z)
 1992–1994 – 4.3 L L35 Vortec 4300 V6, CPFI, 200 hp (149 kW) (VIN W)

Fuel economy
The first generation Bravada with the 160 hp engine averaged United States Environmental Protection Agency city/highway /. The second generation with the 200 hp engine averaged /.

Second generation (1996–2001)

The Bravada was refreshed later than its platform mates, with no 1995 models produced. The 1996 and 1997 models' body featured more rounded lines than their predecessor. This generation Bravada could easily be distinguished from the Chevrolet Blazer and GMC Jimmy by its Oldsmobile-styled body-colored split grille, premium alloy wheels, and lower bodyside cladding. Standard fare included a driver's airbag and daytime running lamps. The interior styling was more appealing to the eye with fewer ridges and squares, much like the exterior. In keeping with its premium image, the Bravada's interior was modified and upgraded, to differ from its Chevrolet/GMC siblings. The front bucket seats were similar to those found on the Aurora. Other interior features included standard leather seating, woodgrain trim, and its unique center console with a leather-wrapped console shifter (as opposed to a column shifter on the Blazer/Jimmy). In 1997, 4-wheel anti-lock disc brakes became standard and the rear spoiler was deleted. As with the previous generation, the Oldsmobile Bravada was available only in 4-door, 5-passenger configuration.

1998

Another refresh occurred in 1998, with the Bravada adopting Oldsmobile's new (and final) version of the "rocket" emblem. The SmartTrak system now featured the computer controlled NP-136 transfer case, which works more like traction control. The Bravada was now run in RWD in normal operations, and only when wheel slip was detected did the SmartTrak engage AWD. A revised interior including dual airbags, heated seats, and a new front fascia which included the new Aurora inspired Oldsmobile logo. OnStar was available in 1999 as a cell phone unit, later becoming integrated into the rearview mirror in 2001 with available features like hands-free calling and virtual advisor. A Bose sound system was added to available options in 1999 and the fuel injection was updated in 2000, though output remained the same. A new two-tone exterior dubbed the Platinum Edition was made available in 2000. This generation was phased out in 2001 to make way for the new GMT360 Bravada.

Engines
 1996–2001 - 4.3 L L35 Vortec 4300 V6, SCPI,  with single exhaust

Fuel economy
The second generation Bravada EPA city/highway averaged /.

Third generation (2002–2004)

Redesigned as a midsize SUV for its third generation, the 2002 Bravada hit showrooms in February 2001. It was the first GMT360 truck introduced, and the last new Oldsmobile model. Like the Chevrolet TrailBlazer and GMC Envoy, it used the new  Atlas straight-six engine. Rear-wheel drive was available for the first time as well, making this the first rear-wheel drive Oldsmobile since the 1992 Custom Cruiser. The Bravada entered the Canadian market at this time. The 4.3L V6 was discontinued in the Bravada in favor of a new engine, making it the first Oldsmobile with a straight-6 engine since the Omega of 1976, and the only GMT360 not to offer a V8 engine option.

Production of the Bravada ended with the demise of the Oldsmobile marque in 2004. The last 500 Bravadas were produced as "Final 500" special editions, each featuring custom seat embroidering and exterior badging inspired by vintage Oldsmobile logos, dark cherry metallic paint, unique chrome alloy wheels, and a medallion featuring that particular Bravada's production number, ranging from 1 to 500.

The very last Bravada, number 500 of the final edition, rolled off the assembly line on January 12, 2004.

The Bravada bodyshell was continued by its joint replacements, the Buick Rainier (2004–07) and the Saab 9-7X (2005–09) — the latter of which remained in production until December 2008.

Engines
 2002–2004 LL8  I6,

Fuel economy
The third generation Bravada EPA city/highway averaged /.

Sales

References

All-wheel-drive vehicles
Bravada
Rear-wheel-drive vehicles
Mid-size sport utility vehicles
Cars introduced in 1991 
Cars discontinued in 2004 
1990s cars
2000s cars